Mullingar is the county town of County Westmeath, Ireland.

Mullingar may also refer to:

 Mullingar (civil parish), civil parish of County Westmeath
 Mullingar (Parliament of Ireland constituency), defunct constituency
 Mullingar, Saskatchewan, hamlet
 Mullingar, Western Australia, suburb of Kalgoorlie